KIYE (88.7 FM) is a radio station licensed to serve the community of Kamiah, Idaho. The station is owned by the Nez Perce Tribe. It airs a variety format. The station's main transmitter is located near Craigmont, Idaho.

The station was assigned the KIYE call letters on January 28, 2010, by the Federal Communications Commission.

See also
List of community radio stations in the United States

References

External links
Official website

Native American radio
IYE
Radio stations established in 2011
2011 establishments in Idaho
Community radio stations in the United States